Shluhot (lit. Branches) is an Orthodox kibbutz in the Beit She'an Valley in northern Israel. Located about three kilometres south of the city of Beit She'an, it falls under the jurisdiction of Valley of Springs Regional Council.

History
Shluhot was founded in 1948 by former members of the Bnei Akiva Zionist youth movement on the land that had belonged to the depopulated Palestinian village of al-Ashrafiyya. Initially, a temporary joint camp was set up with a group from the Hashomer Hatzair youth movement. Shortly thereafter, when each group received land to build separate kibbutzim, the secular members of the group formed the adjacent kibbutz of Reshafim. The kibbutz is one of four religious kibbutzim that are located in a cluster south of Beit She'an stretching from Shluhot at the base of Mount Gilboa through Ein HaNatziv and Sde Eliyahu until Tirat Zvi adjacent to the Jordan River.

Today, the kibbutz population numbers about 120 families, including 350 people.

Since 2007 it is used for the special needs school Kulanu Academy for trips usually run by Dvora Liss, Kenny Goldman, and Evan Wollis and a coteacher that is changed every year. They go learn skills for adulthood as well as tour Israel.

Economy

In the early years of the kibbutz, virtually all activity was centred on the various agricultural branches. In the last few decades though, talented kibbutz members have initiated new endeavours in order to vary revenue sources, as well as providing different employment options. Today the kibbutz employs mainly kibbutz members and kibbutz youth (after school and during the summer), residents who are not members, residents of Beit Shean and surrounding areas, and temporary volunteers. The kibbutz revenues come from agriculture, light manufacturing, and tourism.

The majority of Shluhot's revenues come from various agricultural branches, produce and livestock, due to the expertise of kibbutz members and continuing improvement in efficiency and productivity. The dairy farm, poultry (turkey and chicken coops), date farming, fish farming, orchards, and vegetable farming are still an important part of the kibbutz revenues and kibbutz employment opportunities. Shluhot also has a new carrot processing factory and enjoys a significant minority market share in the local carrot market. In 2007, a cow from the dairy farm broke the Israeli record for most births, 14.

The kibbutz has a number of factories; one of the oldest is Microvue which produces microfilm readers/scanners, mostly for export. Microvue is one of the few microfilm reader manufacturers left in the world. Sheletron, founded in 1996, produces electronic display solutions through text, pictures, video, and animation on LCD screens. Remote control of the displays is possible through unique software developed in the company development centre.

In the early nineties, the kibbutz renovated a small former residential apartment building and turned it into a bed and breakfast, mainly geared for the Orthodox Jewish market. The kibbutz has since added a wider variety of rooming accommodations, now ranging from single rooms to multiple-room housing units. In the year 1996, several former immigrants (olim) from North America founded a summer camp called Kayitz Bakibbutz, (in Hebrew "Summer on the kibbutz"), based on the typical 'American' sleepaway summer camp experience geared toward youth, something virtually unheard of in Israel at that time. The camp provides multiple week sessions based on overnight rooming, and including sports, swimming, arts and crafts and various other activities.

The kibbutz also has a metalwork shop, which designs and produces a variety of machines mainly for agricultural use.

References

External links
Official website 
Kayitz Bakibbutz Summer Camp
 Sheletron
Microvue 

Kibbutzim
Religious Kibbutz Movement
Populated places established in 1948
Populated places in Northern District (Israel)
1948 establishments in Israel